"Love (Your Spell Is Everywhere)", also called "Love, Your Spell Is Everywhere", "Love (Your Magic Spell Is Everywhere)" or "Love Your Spell Is Everywhere", is a traditional pop song first published in 1929, written by Elsie Janis with music composed by Edmund Goulding.

History

The song was first performed by James Melton and Gloria Swanson in 1929 and featured in the talkie The Trespasser. It was later covered by Johnny Mathis, Dean Martin, Kenny Burrell, Sammy Davis Jr., Curtis Fuller, Jackie Gleason, Peggy Lee, Johnny Douglas and Living Strings, Harry James and Henri René.

A 1964 episode of The Red Skelton Hour was called "Love, Your Tragic Smell Is Everywhere or A Hat Full of Hate", a parody of the song title.

See also
 List of 1920s jazz standards

References

External links
Lyrics

1929 songs
1920s jazz standards
Songs with music by Edmund Goulding
Songs with lyrics by Elsie Janis
Sammy Davis Jr. songs
Dean Martin songs
Johnny Mathis songs
American songs